Marcos Antonio Morínigo Fleytas (8 October 1848 – 13 July 1901)  was a Paraguayan politician who served as President of Paraguay in 1894.

He was born in 1848 in Quyquyho (Paraguarí department). In 1881, he was elected for his first term in the Chamber of Deputies, a post he held for more than nine years. In 1887, Morinigo participated in founding the Colorado Party and was elected Vice President of Paraguay in 1890 (alongside President Juan Gualberto González). After González was sacked, he became president on June 8, 1894, until the legal end of the term (November 25, 1894). Morinigo was elected senator in 1895. He died 1901 in Asunción.

References

1848 births
1901 deaths
People from Paraguarí Department
Presidents of Paraguay
Vice presidents of Paraguay
Presidents of the Senate of Paraguay
Colorado Party (Paraguay) politicians